The 2013 Euro Cup of Australian rules football was a 9-a-side Footy tournament held in Bordeaux, France on September 21, 2013, with 12 national men's teams and two women's teams. The men's tournament was won by England who defeated France in the Grand Final by 77 points. The women's match was won by the European Crusaders who defeated France 45–26.

Teams
Pierre de Coubertin Group
 Croatia
 Crusaders
 Finland
Antonin Berodier Group
 Catalonia
 England
 Iceland
Léo Lagrange Group
 France
 Ireland
 Norway
Daniel Jackson Group
 Spain
 Austria 
 Italy
Women's Teams
 France
 Crusaders

Results

Group stage
Pierre de Coubertin Group
 Finland 70 d  Crusaders 3
 Croatia 102 d  Crusaders 7
 Croatia 42 d  Finland 15
Antonin Berodier Group
 Iceland 66 d  Catalonia 9
 England 116 d  Catalonia 2
 England 66 d  Iceland 13
Léo Lagrange Group
 France 41 d  Norway 26
 Ireland 68 d  Norway 4
 France 34 d  Ireland 33
Daniel Jackson Group
 Spain 37 d  Austria 17
 Italy 58 d  Austria 15
 Italy 53 d  Spain 33

Semi-finals
Euro Plate Championship
 Crusaders 81 d  Catalonia 10
 Austria 34 d  Norway 29
Euro Bowl Championship
 Finland 75 d  Iceland 6
 Ireland 98 d  Spain 24
Euro Cup Championship
 England 35 d  Croatia 29
 France 68 d  Italy 49

Finals
11th-place match
 Norway 73 d  Catalonia 19
9th-place match (Euro Plate Champion)
 Austria 39 d  Crusaders 32
7th-place match
 Spain 44 d  Iceland 23
5th-place match (Euro Bowl Champion)
 Ireland 78 d  Finland 5
3rd-place match
 Croatia 77 d  Italy 34
Grand Final (Euro Cup Champion)
 England 92 d  France 15

Women's Match
 Crusaders 45 d  France 26

Results

References

EU Cup
International sports competitions hosted by France
2013 in French sport
2013 in European sport
2013 in Australian rules football